Batey may refer to:

 Batey (game), a plaza for community events in the Caribbean Taino culture 
 Batey (sugar workers' town)
 Batey (surname)